110 Squadron or 110th Squadron may refer to:

 110 Squadron (Israel), a unit of the Israeli Air Force
 No. 110 Squadron RAF, a unit of the United Kingdom Royal Air Force
 110th Bomb Squadron, a unit of the United States Air Force

See also
 110th Division (disambiguation)
 110th Regiment (disambiguation)